John Frank Stathers is an Australian former rugby league footballer who played in the 1950s and 1960s.  He was a versatile back who won a premiership with St George Dragons in the  New South Wales Rugby League competition.

Playing career
A St. George junior from the Renown United club, Stathers played three first grade seasons with the St George Dragons between 1959 and 1961. He won a premiership with Saints when he played centre alongside Reg Gasnier in the 1960 Grand Final and he also won a Thirsd Grade premiership with the Dragons in 1957.

He suffered a career ending broken leg in 1963, and retired from football to pursue his career as a teacher. He was later promoted to acting Director of the New South Wales Department of Sport and Recreation, under Minister Ken Booth.

References

St. George Dragons players
Australian rugby league players
Living people
Year of birth missing (living people)
Rugby league centres